Tell Damshij, also known as Qodchanis, is a village near Tell Tamer in western al-Hasakah Governorate, northeastern Syria. Administratively it belongs to the Nahiya Tell Tamer.

The village is inhabited by Assyrians belonging to the Assyrian Church of the East. At the 2004 census, it had a population of 153.

See also

Assyrians in Syria
List of Assyrian settlements
Al-Hasakah offensive (February–March 2015)

References

Assyrian communities in Syria